Rolf Blättler (born 24 October 1942) is a former Swiss international footballer. He played as midfielder or forward.

Club career
From 1963 to 1969 Blättler played for Grasshopper Club Zürich. During the 1964–65 Nationalliga A season he scored 19 goals in 26 league games, becoming Top goalscorer together with Pierre Kerkhoffs. He managed the title again during the following season with 28 goals and in the 1966–67 Nationalliga A season he won the title for the third time. This time joint with Fritz Künzli.

Blättler then transferred for two years to Lugano. After which he spent the 1971—72 season with Basel and won the championship. During this season he played a total of 39 matches for Basel scoring 13 goals, of which 25 were league games in which he scored 9 goals. In 1972 Blättler transferred to St. Gallen where he stayed four seasons before he moved to Luzern.

International career
Blättler played his debut for the Swiss national team on 22 October 1966 in a test match against Belgium, in the Olympiastadion in Sint-Andries, Bruges. Switzerland lost 0–1. He scored his first two goals for his country on 24 May 1967 in the 7—1 win against Romania.

Coaching career
In 1979 Blättler transferred to Locarno and became player-manager. He stayed trainer until 1984. Blättler was also coach of the Swiss U23  and the Swiss U21 teams.

Honours
Basel
 Nationalliga A: 1971—72

References

Grasshopper Club Zürich players
FC Lugano players
FC Basel players
FC St. Gallen players
FC Locarno players
Swiss men's footballers
Swiss football managers
Switzerland international footballers
Association football midfielders
FC Basel managers
1942 births
Living people